Eva-Maria Fitze (born 10 May 1982 in Dachau) is a German figure skater who competed in both ladies' singles and pairs. As a singles skater, she was the youngest woman ever to win senior gold at the German Championships, taking the title at age 14 in 1997. She added another national title in 1999.

Following the 2001–2002 season, Fitze switched to pair skating. She teamed up with Rico Rex in spring 2002. The duo won a national championship in 2003 and competed in the 2006 Winter Olympics, finishing 15th.

Programs 
(with Rex)

Competitive highlights

Pair skating with Rex

Single skating

References

External links
 
 

1982 births
Living people
People from Dachau
Sportspeople from Upper Bavaria
German female pair skaters
German female single skaters
Figure skaters at the 2006 Winter Olympics
Olympic figure skaters of Germany